In probability theory, the multinomial distribution is a generalization of the binomial distribution. For example, it models the probability of counts for each side of a k-sided die rolled n times. For n independent trials each of which leads to a success for exactly one of k categories, with each category having a given fixed success probability, the multinomial distribution gives the probability of any particular combination of numbers of successes for the various categories.

When k is 2 and n is 1, the multinomial distribution is the Bernoulli distribution. When k is 2 and n is bigger than 1, it is the binomial distribution. When k is bigger than 2 and n is 1, it is the categorical distribution. The term "multinoulli" is sometimes used for the categorical distribution to emphasize this four-way relationship (so n determines the prefix, and k the suffix).

The Bernoulli distribution models the outcome of a single Bernoulli trial. In other words, it models whether flipping a (possibly biased) coin one time will result in either a success (obtaining a head) or failure (obtaining a tail). The binomial distribution generalizes this to the number of heads from performing n independent flips (Bernoulli trials) of the same coin. The multinomial distribution models the outcome of n experiments, where the outcome of each trial has a categorical distribution, such as rolling a k-sided die n times.

Let k be a fixed finite number. Mathematically, we have k possible mutually exclusive outcomes, with corresponding probabilities p1, ..., pk, and n independent trials. Then if the random variables Xi indicate the number of times outcome number i is observed over the n trials, the vector X = (X1, ..., Xk) follows a multinomial distribution with parameters n and p, where p = (p1, ..., pk). While the trials are independent, their outcomes Xi are dependent because they must be summed to n.

Definitions

Probability mass function
Suppose one does an experiment of extracting n balls of k different colors from a bag, replacing the extracted balls after each draw. Balls of the same color are equivalent. Denote the variable which is the number of extracted balls of color i (i = 1, ..., k) as Xi, and denote as pi the probability that a given extraction will be in color i. The probability mass function of this multinomial distribution is:

 

for non-negative integers x1, ..., xk.

The probability mass function can be expressed using the gamma function as:

This form shows its resemblance to the Dirichlet distribution, which is its conjugate prior.

Example 

Suppose that in a three-way election for a large country, candidate A received 20% of the votes, candidate B received 30% of the votes, and candidate C received 50% of the votes.  If six voters are selected randomly, what is the probability that there will be exactly one supporter for candidate A, two supporters for candidate B and three supporters for candidate C in the sample?

Note: Since we’re assuming that the voting population is large, it is reasonable and permissible to think of the probabilities as unchanging once a voter is selected for the sample.  Technically speaking this is sampling without replacement, so the correct distribution is the multivariate hypergeometric distribution, but the distributions converge as the population grows large in comparison to a fixed sample size.

Properties

Expected value and variance 
The expected number of times the outcome i was observed over n trials is

The covariance matrix is as follows.  Each diagonal entry is the variance of a binomially distributed random variable, and is therefore

The off-diagonal entries are the covariances:

for i, j distinct.

All covariances are negative because for fixed n, an increase in one component of a multinomial vector requires a decrease in another component.

When these expressions are combined into a matrix with i, j element  the result is a k × k positive-semidefinite covariance matrix of rank k − 1. In the special case where k = n and where the pi are all equal, the covariance matrix is the centering matrix.

The entries of the corresponding correlation matrix are

Note that the sample size drops out of this expression.

Each of the k components separately has a binomial distribution with parameters n and pi, for the appropriate value of the subscript i.

The support of the multinomial distribution is the set

 

Its number of elements is

Matrix notation 
In matrix notation, 

and 

with  = the row vector transpose of the column vector .

Visualization

As slices of generalized Pascal's triangle 
Just like one can interpret the binomial distribution as (normalized) one-dimensional (1D) slices of Pascal's triangle, so too can one interpret the multinomial distribution as 2D (triangular) slices of Pascal's pyramid, or 3D/4D/+ (pyramid-shaped) slices of higher-dimensional analogs of Pascal's triangle. This reveals an interpretation of the range of the distribution: discretized equilateral "pyramids" in arbitrary dimension—i.e. a simplex with a grid.

As polynomial coefficients 
Similarly, just like one can interpret the binomial distribution as the polynomial coefficients of  when expanded, one can interpret the multinomial distribution as the coefficients of  when expanded, noting that just the coefficients must sum up to 1.

Related distributions
In some fields such as natural language processing, categorical and multinomial distributions are synonymous and it is common to speak of a multinomial distribution when a categorical distribution is actually meant. This stems from the fact that it is sometimes convenient to express the outcome of a categorical distribution as a "1-of-K" vector (a vector with one element containing a 1 and all other elements containing a 0) rather than as an integer in the range ; in this form, a categorical distribution is equivalent to a multinomial distribution over a single trial.

 When k = 2, the multinomial distribution is the binomial distribution.
 Categorical distribution, the distribution of each trial; for k = 2, this is the Bernoulli distribution.
 The Dirichlet distribution is the conjugate prior of the multinomial in Bayesian statistics.
 Dirichlet-multinomial distribution.
 Beta-binomial distribution.
 Negative multinomial distribution
 Hardy–Weinberg principle (it is a trinomial distribution with probabilities )

Statistical inference

Equivalence tests for multinomial distributions
The goal of equivalence testing is to establish the agreement between a theoretical multinomial distribution and  observed counting frequencies. The theoretical distribution may be a fully specified multinomial distribution or a parametric family of multinomial distributions.

Let  denote a theoretical multinomial distribution and let  be a true underlying distribution. The equivalence test problem is  versus  . The true underlying distribution  is unknown. Instead, the counting frequencies  are observed, where  is a sample size. An equivalence test uses  to reject . The equivalence test for Euclidean distance can be found in text book of Wellek (2010). The equivalence test for the total variation distance is developed in Ostrovski (2017). The exact equivalence test for the specific cumulative distance is proposed in Frey (2009).

The distance  is usually computed using numerical optimization. The tests for this case are developed recently in Ostrovski (2018).

Random variate generation 

First, reorder the parameters  such that they are sorted in descending order (this is only to speed up computation and not strictly necessary). Now, for each trial, draw an auxiliary variable X from a uniform (0, 1) distribution. The resulting outcome is the component

 

A sum of independent repetitions of this experiment is an observation from a multinomial distribution with n equal to the number of such repetitions.

References

Citations

Sources 

 
 

Discrete distributions
Multivariate discrete distributions
Factorial and binomial topics
Exponential family distributions